Seydou Elimane Diarra (23 November 1933 – 19 July 2020) was an Ivorian politician, who served as the Prime Minister in 2000 and again from 2003 to 2005.

Life and career
Diarra was born on 23 November 1933 in Katiola. Prior to joining the government, he was an Ambassador to the European Economic Community and Brazil and was President of the Chamber of Commerce and Industry of Ivory Coast. After the December 1999 military coup, he was appointed  Minister of State for Planning, Development, and Government Cooperation on 4 January 2000, under transitional President Robert Guéï. He was subsequently Prime Minister from May 2000 to October 2000.

He was again appointed Prime Minister in February 2003 as part of a deal to end the 2002-2003 civil war, because he was widely considered to be a neutral figure; however, many supporters of President Laurent Gbagbo accused him of not taking a strong stance against the rebels, despite their failure to disarm in October 2004, and demanded his resignation.

On 5 December 2005, African Union mediators announced that Diarra was to be replaced by Charles Konan Banny, effective on 7 December.

Education 
Seydou Diarra was originally from the north of Côte d'Ivoire and a Muslim. A scholarship holder from the French Republic, he studied in La Rochelle and then obtained a diploma in agricultural engineering from the École nationale supérieure agronomique de Montpellier.

Death
Diarra died in Abidjan on 19 July 2020, at the age of 86.

References

External links
 Report on Diarra's replacement as PM

1933 births
2020 deaths
Ivorian Muslims
Heads of government of Ivory Coast
People from Vallée du Bandama District
Ambassadors of Ivory Coast to the European Union
Ambassadors of Ivory Coast to Brazil
Government ministers of Ivory Coast